Rafael Nadal defeated Kevin Anderson in the final, 6–3, 6–3, 6–4.	
It was his third US Open title and 16th major title overall. It was also his first hard court title since January 2014.

Stan Wawrinka was the reigning champion, but did not participate due to a knee injury that ended his season prematurely. Wawrinka's withdrawal ended his streak of 50 consecutive major appearances, dating back to the 2005 French Open. Defending finalist Novak Djokovic also withdrew due to an elbow injury that ended his season, ending his streak of 51 consecutive major appearances, dating back to the 2005 Australian Open. Accordingly, this was the first men's singles draw at the US Open since 1971 to include neither finalist from the previous year's tournament.

After the loss of Marin Čilić in the third round, a first-time major finalist was guaranteed from the bottom half of the draw. Anderson was the first South African man to reach the final since Cliff Drysdale in 1965, and at any major singles final since Kevin Curren at the 1984 Australian Open, as well as the lowest-ranked male player to reach the US Open singles final since the ATP rankings began in 1973. Anderson was also the tallest major finalist in history, at 6 feet 8 inches.

Roger Federer broke the men's singles record for total appearances at Grand Slams with his 71st participation, he was attempting to win a 19-match major winning streak at the start of the season tied with Rod Laver and Jimmy Connors, but lost to Juan Martín del Potro in the quarterfinals on a rematch of the 2009 final. Also, Andrey Rublev became the youngest man to reach the US Open quarterfinals since Andy Roddick in 2001, and Denis Shapovalov the youngest man to reach the fourth round of the US Open since Michael Chang in 1989. Sam Querrey also became the first American man to reach the quarterfinals of the US Open since John Isner and Andy Roddick in 2011. Also, Pablo Carreño Busta made his first major semifinal appearance, becoming the first Spanish semifinalist since David Ferrer in 2012 other than Nadal.

Diego Schwartzman became the shortest man (5'7") to reach a Grand Slam singles quarterfinal since Jaime Yzaga (also 5'7") did so at the 1994 US Open. He lost to Carreño Busta in the quarterfinals. This was future World Number 1 and 2021 US Open champion Daniil Medvedev's first US Open appearance. He lost in the first round to Shapovalov.

Seeds

Draw

Finals

Top half

Section 1

Section 2

Section 3

Section 4

Bottom half

Section 5

Section 6

Section 7

Section 8

Seeded players
The following are the seeded players. Seeds are based on the rankings as of August 21, 2017. Rank and points before are as of August 28, 2017.

Withdrawn players
The following players would have been seeded, but withdrew before the tournament began.

Other entry information

Wild cards

Protected ranking

Qualifiers

Lucky losers

Withdrawals

Retirements

Notes

References

External links
 Men's Singles main draw
2017 US Open – Men's draws and results at the International Tennis Federation

Men's Singles
US Open – Men's Singles
US Open (tennis) by year – Men's singles